Caldera de Taburiente National Park is a national park on the island of La Palma, Canary Islands, Spain.  It contains the Caldera de Taburiente, which dominates the northern part of the island, and was designated as a national park in 1954. The telescopes of the Roque de los Muchachos Observatory are situated very close to the summit.

Toponym
The word caldera means cauldron in Spanish. Taburiente is not a Spanish word but derives from the Guanche language and means "plain, level".

Geography

The caldera is about 10 km across, and in places the walls tower 2000 m over the caldera floor. The highest point is the Roque de los Muchachos on the northern wall, at 2426 m altitude, which can be reached by road. The Cumbrecita is at a lower point in the south-eastern part of the caldera's rim. In the south-west, the caldera opens to the sea, through a riverbed called the Barranco de las Angustias. The Cumbre Nueva is a ridge that starts at the caldera and continues to the south. The caldera originated some 2 million years ago, with a massive shield volcano about 20 km in diameter. The caldera was not formed by an explosion of that volcano, however, but by erosion starting from the volcano's original crater.

IUGS geological heritage site
In respect of its importance in the development of volcanology, 'Taburiente volcanic Caldera' was included by the International Union of Geological Sciences (IUGS) in its assemblage of 100 'geological heritage sites' around the world in a listing published in October 2022. The organisation defines an 'IUGS Geological Heritage Site' as 'a key place with geological elements and/or processes of international scientific relevance, used as a reference, and/or with a substantial contribution to the development of geological sciences through history.'

Wildlife
The main flora of the national park comprises a large forest of Canary Island Pine, with a population of the endangered Canary Islands Juniper also present. The park has been recognised as an Important Bird Area (IBA) by BirdLife International because it supports populations of laurel pigeons, red-billed choughs and Atlantic canaries.

Human history
During the Spanish conquest of the Canary Islands in the 15th century, the caldera was the site of the last stand of the indigenous people of the archipelago, a branch of the Guanches known as Benahoaritas.  It proved impregnable to the invading Spaniards, and they only defeated the Benahoarita by luring their leader out on the pretext of holding talks.

In 1815, German geologist Christian Leopold von Buch visited the Canary Islands, during which he visited the island of Tenerife where he was taken to the Caldera de las Cañadas. He visited La Palma after he had been to Tenerife, and in his journal he makes it clear that he was able to distinguish between a caldera of volcanic origin and the erosional origins for the caldera Taburiente. Following his return to Germany he published his journal and he introduced the term caldera to the geological vocabulary.

In the 1830s, the caldera provided inspiration for some art that combined a study of geology with botany, such as the work of Sabin Berthelot and Felix-Achille St. Aulaire.

See also
Idafe Rock

References

National parks of Spain
La Palma
Protected areas established in 1954
Protected areas of the Canary Islands
Natura 2000 in Spain
Volcanoes of the Canary Islands
Important Bird Areas of the Canary Islands
First 100 IUGS Geological Heritage Sites